Kirill Kozhevnikov (born 26 January 1999) is a Russian professional ice hockey forward who is currently under contract with HC Spartak Moscow of the Kontinental Hockey League (KHL).

References

External links
 

1999 births
Living people
Rubin Tyumen players
Russian ice hockey centres
HC Sochi players
HC Spartak Moscow players
Windsor Spitfires players
People from Nizhnevartovsk
HC Yugra players
Sportspeople from Khanty-Mansi Autonomous Okrug